Romilly is a commune in the Loir-et-Cher department in central France.

Population

In media

In the movie Passage to Marseille, the character Jean Matrac, who is in the Free French Air Forces, after each of several missions, flies over Romilly to a drop a message to his wife Paula and their son Jean, who live in the town. Humphrey Bogart played Matrac. Michèle Morgan played Paula and Peter Miles played Jean, Jr.

See also
Communes of the Loir-et-Cher department

References

Communes of Loir-et-Cher